Trevor Lawrence is an American saxophonist (baritone and tenor saxes), composer, arranger and record producer.

As a session musician, Lawrence has performed both as a studio musician and as a touring musician in the horn sections for groups including the Rolling Stones with Steve Madaio and Bobby Keys and with the Paul Butterfield Blues Band along with Madaio, David Sanborn and Gene Dinwiddie that performed at the Woodstock music festival in 1969.

As an arranger, Lawrence collaborated on Etta James' 1962 eponymous album and on the Pointer Sisters' 1982 So Excited! album, which he also co-produced.

Personal life

Lawrence was married to Lynda Laurence of the Supremes. They have a son, Trevor Lawrence Jr., born in 1973.

Discography

As producer/co-producer 

1976: ...That's the Way It Is – Harry Nilsson
1982: So Excited! – Pointer Sisters
1984: In the Evening – Sheryl Lee Ralph

As sideman 

1969: Keep On Moving – The Butterfield Blues Band
1972: Trouble Man – Marvin Gaye
1972: Talking Book – Stevie Wonder
1972: Guess Who – B. B. King 
1973: Ringo – Ringo Starr
1974: I Can Stand a Little Rain – Joe Cocker
1975: Duit on Mon Dei – Harry Nilsson
1975: Playing Possum – Carly Simon
1975: Jamaica Say You Will – Joe Cocker
1976: Sandman – Harry Nilsson 
1976: Songs in the Key of Life – Stevie Wonder<ref>Lundy, Zeth. [https://books.google.es/books?hl=es&id=bdmoAwAAQBAJ&dq=Trevor+lawrence+sax&q=trevor#v=snippet&q=trevor&f=false Stevie Wonder's Songs in the Key of Life, p. 67. Bloomsbury Publishing USA, 2007.] At Google Books. Retrieved 4 July 2019.</ref>
1976: Sweet Harmony – Maria Muldaur
1977: Reckless Abandon – David Bromberg
1979: The Glow'' – Bonnie Raitt
1981: Black & White – Pointer Sisters

References

Living people
20th-century American saxophonists
American jazz saxophonists
American male saxophonists
American session musicians
Jazz tenor saxophonists
Jazz baritone saxophonists
21st-century American male musicians
American male jazz musicians
Year of birth missing (living people)
20th-century American male musicians